Henri Liebman (born 29 January 1964), known as Riton Liebman, is a Belgian comedian, actor, and director.

Career
Liebman made his first impression with audiences at age 13, when French director Bertrand Blier discovered him and cast him as Christian in the 1978 film Get Out Your Handkerchiefs, where he is credited simply as Riton. While Liebman said he had strained relations with stars Gérard Depardieu and Patrick Dewaere, Blier defended him during and after filming.

Liebman made his directorial debut with Je suis supporter du Standard (2013).

Filmography

Theater

References

External links

1964 births
Belgian male actors
Belgian male comedians
Living people